The 2020–21 Alabama–Huntsville Chargers men's ice hockey season was the 36th season of play for the program, the 28th at the Division I level and the 8th in the WCHA conference. The Chargers represented the University of Alabama Huntsville and were coached by Lance West, in his 1st season.

The start of the college hockey season was delayed due to the ongoing coronavirus pandemic. As a result, Alabama–Huntsville's first scheduled game was in mid-November as opposed to early-October, which was the norm.

Season
As a result of the ongoing COVID-19 pandemic the entire college ice hockey season was delayed. Because the NCAA had previously announced that all winter sports athletes would retain whatever eligibility they possessed through at least the following year, none of Alabama–Huntsville's players would lose a season of play. However, the NCAA also approved a change in its transfer regulations that would allow players to transfer and play immediately rather than having to sit out a season, as the rules previously required.

Due to the program's financial crisis that nearly prevented the Chargers from fielding a team for this season, as well as the departure of former head coach Mike Corbett, many players transferred to other teams in the offseason. The loss of the experience these players possessed hamstrung the Chargers efforts to improve their record and ended with the team predictably near the bottom of the conference. UAH won only 3 of their 22 games all season but were rescued from a last-place finish by Ferris State winning only one of their games. Despite the few wins, there were some positive signs from the hastily assembled team; freshman Tyrone Bronte led the team in scoring, indicating that the team may be able to recover from its recent struggles if the program's financial stability could be assured.

Departures

Recruiting

Roster
As of October 14, 2020.

Standings

Schedule and Results

|-
!colspan=12 style=";" | Regular Season

|-
!colspan=12 style=";" | 

|- align="center" bgcolor="#e0e0e0"
|colspan=12|Alabama–Huntsville Lost Series 0–2

Scoring Statistics

Goaltending statistics

Rankings

USCHO did not release a poll in week 20.

Awards and honors

References

Alabama–Huntsville Chargers men's ice hockey seasons
Alabama-Huntsville Chargers
Alabama-Huntsville Chargers
Alabama-Huntsville Chargers
2020 in sports in Alabama
2021 in sports in Alabama